Hydronectria is a genus of fungi in the class Sordariomycetes. The relationship of this taxon to other taxa within the class is unknown (incertae sedis). A monotypic genus, it contains the single species Hydronectria kriegeriana, described by German mycologist Wilhelm Kirschstein in 1925.

References

Sordariomycetes enigmatic taxa
Monotypic Sordariomycetes genera